Listed below are 224 marches outside the United States in support of the 2017 Women's March.

North America 
More than thirty events were organized across Canada with at least twenty organized in British Columbia alone.

Hundreds of Canadians were estimated to have travelled to Washington, D.C. to attend the rally. A number of Canadians heading to the United States to attend other protests and rallies were turned away at the Canada–United States border. In at least one case, border agents went through the individual's email and Facebook before denying him entry.

South America

Europe

Africa

Asia

Oceania

Antarctica

Notes

References

External links 

 

2017 in American politics
2017 in Asia
2017 in Europe
2017 in North America
2017 in Oceania
2017 in Africa
2017 protests
2017-related lists
Feminism-related lists
Foreign relations of the United States
History of women's rights
Human rights-related lists
Inauguration of Donald Trump
January 2017 events
Lists of places
Protests against Donald Trump
Protest marches
Reactions to the election of Donald Trump
2017 in women's history
Women's marches
Gatherings of women
List of 2017 Women's March locations
Articles containing video clips
January 2017 events in India
Protests in India